In number theory and algebraic geometry, the Tate conjecture is a 1963 conjecture of John Tate that would describe the algebraic cycles on a variety in terms of a more computable invariant, the Galois representation on étale cohomology. The conjecture is a central problem in the theory of algebraic cycles. It can be considered an arithmetic analog of the Hodge conjecture.

Statement of the conjecture
Let V be a smooth projective variety over a field k which is finitely generated over its prime field. Let ks be a separable closure of k, and let G be the absolute Galois group Gal(ks/k) of k. Fix a prime number ℓ which is invertible in k. Consider the ℓ-adic cohomology groups (coefficients in the ℓ-adic integers Zℓ, scalars then extended to the ℓ-adic numbers Qℓ) of the base extension of V to ks; these groups are representations of G. For any i ≥ 0, a codimension-i subvariety of V (understood to be defined over k) determines an element of the cohomology group

which is fixed by G. Here Qℓ(i ) denotes the ith Tate twist, which means that this representation of the Galois group G is tensored with the ith power of the cyclotomic character.

The Tate conjecture states that the subspace WG of W fixed by the Galois group G is spanned, as a Qℓ-vector space, by the classes of codimension-i subvarieties of V. An algebraic cycle means a finite linear combination of subvarieties; so an equivalent statement is that every element of WG is the class of an algebraic cycle on V with Qℓ coefficients.

Known cases
The Tate conjecture for divisors (algebraic cycles of codimension 1) is a major open problem. For example, let f : X → C be a morphism from a smooth projective surface onto a smooth projective curve over a finite field. Suppose that the generic fiber F of f, which is a curve over the function field k(C), is smooth over k(C). Then the Tate conjecture for divisors on X is equivalent to the Birch and Swinnerton-Dyer conjecture for the Jacobian variety of F. By contrast, the Hodge conjecture for divisors on any smooth complex projective variety is known (the Lefschetz (1,1)-theorem).

Probably the most important known case is that the Tate conjecture is true for divisors on abelian varieties. This is a theorem of Tate for abelian varieties over finite fields, and of Faltings for abelian varieties over number fields, part of Faltings's solution of the Mordell conjecture. Zarhin extended these results to any finitely generated base field. The Tate conjecture for divisors on abelian varieties implies the Tate conjecture for divisors on any product of curves C1 × ... × Cn.

The (known) Tate conjecture for divisors on abelian varieties is equivalent to a powerful statement about homomorphisms between abelian varieties. Namely, for any abelian varieties A and B over a finitely generated field k, the natural map

is an isomorphism.  In particular, an abelian variety A is determined up to isogeny by the Galois representation on its Tate module H1(Aks, Zℓ).

The Tate conjecture also holds for K3 surfaces over finitely generated fields of characteristic not 2. (On a surface, the nontrivial part of the conjecture is about divisors.) In characteristic zero, the Tate conjecture for K3 surfaces was proved by André and Tankeev. For K3 surfaces over finite fields of characteristic not 2, the Tate conjecture was proved by Nygaard, Ogus, Charles, Madapusi Pera, and Maulik.

 surveys known cases of the Tate conjecture.

Related conjectures

Let X be a smooth projective variety over a finitely generated field k. The semisimplicity conjecture predicts that the representation of the Galois group G = Gal(ks/k) on the ℓ-adic cohomology of X is semisimple (that is, a direct sum of irreducible representations). For k of characteristic 0,  showed that the Tate conjecture (as stated above) implies the semisimplicity of

For k finite of order q, Tate showed that the Tate conjecture plus the semisimplicity conjecture would imply the strong Tate conjecture, namely that the order of the pole of the zeta function Z(X, t) at t = q−j is equal to the rank of the group of algebraic cycles of codimension j modulo numerical equivalence.

Like the Hodge conjecture, the Tate conjecture would imply most of Grothendieck's standard conjectures on algebraic cycles. Namely, it would imply the Lefschetz standard conjecture (that the inverse of the Lefschetz isomorphism is defined by an algebraic correspondence); that the Künneth components of the diagonal are algebraic; and that numerical equivalence and homological equivalence of algebraic cycles are the same.

Notes

References

External links 
James Milne, The Tate conjecture over finite fields (AIM talk).

Topological methods of algebraic geometry
Diophantine geometry
Conjectures
Unsolved problems in number theory